Westerhout 50 (W50) or SNR G039.7-02.0, also referred to as the Manatee Nebula,  is a supernova remnant located in the constellation Aquila, about 18,000 light years away. In its centre lies the micro-quasar SS 433, whose jets are distorting the remnant's shell. Most likely W50 and SS 433 are related objects, remnants from a supernova which occurred about 20,000 years ago.

Notes

Book sources

External links
 "The Mystery of SS433"
 Radio image (NRAO)
 X-ray image (ROSAT) 
 Cosmic manatee accelerates particles from head (ESA)

Supernova remnants
Aquila (constellation)